You Make Me Wanna may refer to:

"You Make Me Wanna", song by Dead or Alive from Sophisticated Boom Boom, 1984
"You Make Me Wanna...", Usher song released in 1997
"U Make Me Wanna" (Blue song), released in 2003
"U Make Me Wanna" (Jadakiss song), featuring Mariah Carey and released in 2004